The Roman Catholic Diocese of Aurangabad is a diocese located in the city of Aurangabad in the Ecclesiastical province of Nagpur in India.

History
 17 December 1977: Established as Diocese of Aurangabad from the Diocese of Amravati and the Metropolitan Archdiocese of Hyderabad.

Leadership
 Bishops of Aurangabad (Latin Rite)
Bishop Ambrose Rebello (13 May 2015 – present)
 Bishop Edwin Colaço (20 October 2006 –13 May 2015)
 Bishop Sylvester Monteiro (9 February 1999 – 14 August 2005)
 Bishop Ignatius D'Cunha (6 February 1989 – 20 January 1998)
 Bishop Dominic Joseph Abreo (17 December 1977 – 1 May 1987)

References

External links
 GCatholic.org 
 Catholic Hierarchy 

Roman Catholic dioceses in India
Christian organizations established in 1977
Roman Catholic dioceses and prelatures established in the 20th century
1977 establishments in Maharashtra
Christianity in Maharashtra
Aurangabad, Maharashtra